Dominion in Osaka-jo Hall was a professional wrestling event promoted by New Japan Pro-Wrestling (NJPW). The event took place on July 12, 2020, in Osaka, Osaka, at the Osaka-jō Hall and was the twelfth event under the Dominion name and sixth in a row that took place at the Osaka-jō Hall.

Production

Background
Dominion in Osaka-jo Hall was officially announced on June 9, 2019, during Dominion 6.9 in Osaka-jo Hall. It was scheduled to take place on June 14, 2020, but was postponed to July 12, to allow the rescheduled New Japan Cup tournament to take place instead, as the tournament was originally planned to be held earlier in the year but was cancelled due to the COVID-19 pandemic. Due to the pandemic, the arena was limited to one-third capacity.

Storylines
Dominion in Osaka-jo Hall featured professional wrestling matches that involve different wrestlers from pre-existing scripted feuds and storylines. Wrestlers portray villains, heroes, or less distinguishable characters in the scripted events that built tension and culminated in a wrestling match or series of matches.

Results

See also
2020 in professional wrestling
List of NJPW major events

References

External links
Official New Japan Pro-Wrestling website

NJPW Dominion
2020 in professional wrestling
July 2020 events in Japan
Professional wrestling in Osaka
Events in Osaka
Sports events postponed due to the COVID-19 pandemic